Blinding is a novel in three volumes by the Romanian writer Mircea Cărtărescu. It consists of the installments Aripa stângă ("The left wing") from 1996, Corpul ("The body") from 2002, and Aripa dreaptă ("The right wing") from 2007. An English translation of the first volume was published in October 2013.

See also
 Romanian literature

References

1996 novels
2002 novels
2007 novels
Novels by Mircea Cărtărescu
Romanian novels